{{Infobox military unit
|unit_name=861 Missile Regiment (Laleali & Picquet 707)
|image=
|caption=
|dates= 1963 – present
|country= India
|allegiance=India
|branch=  Indian Army
|type=  Artillery
|role=
|size= Regiment
|command_structure=
|equipment= BrahMos

|Past Commanders= 
|ceremonial_chief=
|colonel_of_the_regiment= 
|notable_commanders= 

|identification_symbol=
|identification_symbol_label=Abbreviation

|nickname=
|patron=
| identification_symbol_2 = "Swamiye Saranam Ayyappa"
| identification_symbol_2_label =War Cry
|motto=Sarvatra Izat O Iqbal (Everywhere with Honour and Glory)  “Do it right - First time – Every time”
|colors= "Red & Navy Blue"
|mascot=
|battles=
|anniversaries=
|decorations= Sena Medal 1COAS Commendation Card 4 VCOAS Commendation Card 7GOC-in-C Commendation Card 9  
|battle_honours= LalealiPicquet 707

}}

861 Missile Regiment (Laleali & Picquet 707) is a missile equipped regiment which is part of the Regiment of Artillery of the Indian Army.

History

Formation
861 Missile Regiment (Laleali & Picquet 707) traces its origin from the Border Scouts Battalion.  It was raised as the 863 Light Battery by amalgamating a nucleus of 121 (Independent) Heavy Mortar Battery (Congo) and a battery of 35 Heavy Mortar Regiment on 20 June 1963. Lieutenant Colonel Sewa Ram was the first Commanding Officer. 
86 Light Regiment was eventually formed with three batteries – 121 Heavy Mortar Battery, 862 Light Battery and 863 Light Battery. This eventually evolved to become the 861 Missile Regiment.

Operations

 United Nations Operation in the Congo
121 Heavy Mortar Battery participated in the Indian Army United Nations peacekeeping mission in Congo under 99 Infantry Brigade.

Indo-Pak War (1965) 
86 Light Regiment participated in Operation Ablaze and Operation Riddle. 
Indo-Pakistani War of 1971 
The Regiment provided fire power to 28 Infantry Brigade of 10 Infantry Division in the Battle of Chamb. The devastating shelling by the Regiment on 3 and 4 December 1971 helped beat back the attack on Picquet 707. The shelling on 6 and 7 December 1971 similarly prevented the attack on Laleali. The Regiment along with 8 Jammu and Kashmir Militia (now Light Infantry) were awarded the battle honours Laleali and Picquet 707''.
Other operations 
The Regiment has also taken part in Operation Meghdoot, Operation Vijay and Operation Parakram.

BrahMos
The Regiment was the first Army unit to get inducted with the BrahMos medium-range ramjet supersonic cruise missile in June 2007. It is presently part of the 40 Artillery Division. 

The Regiment had the honour of participating in the annual Republic Day parade in 2008, 2009, 2011, 2014 and 2017.

See also
List of artillery regiments of Indian Army

References

Military units and formations established in 1963
Artillery regiments of the Indian Army after 1947